The 1908–09 Georgetown Hoyas men's basketball team represented Georgetown University during the 1908–09 Intercollegiate Athletic Association of the United States college basketball season. Maurice Joyce coached the team in his second season as head coach. Georgetown was an independent and – after its home opener at the Convention Hall at 5th and K Streets NW in downtown Washington, D.C., where it had played home games the previous season – played its home games at the Odd Fellows Hall at 8th and D Streets NW  in downtown Washington. The team finished the season with a record of 9-5.

Season recap
Freshman forward-center Frank Schlosser joined the team this season and played in all 14 games, immediately establishing himself as a scoring mainstay. He led the team in scoring, as he would in all four years of his career; this season he scored 128 points, averaging 9.1 points per game.

Georgetown University Law School student and forward Fred Rice was in his second season with the Hoyas. He started all 14 games the Hoyas played, scoring 34 field goals and shooting 42-for-75 (56.0%) from the free-throw line for a total of 110 points and a 7.9 points per game. He finished second only to Schlosser in scoring for the year.

The teams nine wins this season included victories over basketball powers Virginia, Navy, and Penn State. Walter C. Foster, writing for Spalding's Basketball Guide, picked Georgetown as Southern champion.

Roster
Sources

Georgetown players did not wear numbers on their jerseys this season. The first numbered jerseys in Georgetown mens basketball history would not appear until the 1933-34 season.

Forward James Colliflower, a Georgetown University Law School student and three-season letterman in his second of three years playing with the team, would later serve as Georgetowns head coach during the 1911-12, 1912-13, 1913-14, and 1921-22 seasons.

1908–09 schedule and results
Sources

It was common practice at this time for colleges and universities to include non-collegiate opponents in their schedules, with the games recognized as part of their official record for the season, and the games against the Washington YMCA all counted as part of Georgetowns won-loss record for 1908-09. It was not until 1952, after the completion of the 1951-52 season, that the National Collegiate Athletic Association (NCAA) ruled that colleges and universities could no longer count games played against non-collegiate opponents in their annual won-loss records.

Georgetown met Navy for the first time this season, playing the Midshipmen three times and winning two of the games. It was the last success Georgetown would have against Navy until 1928; the Hoyas would lose 15 straight games to the Midshipmen in the interim.

|-
!colspan=9 style="background:#002147; color:#8D817B;"| Regular Season

References

Georgetown Hoyas men's basketball seasons
Georgetown
Georgetown Hoyas men's basketball team
Georgetown Hoyas men's basketball team